The coach's box (or coaches' box for multiple coaches) is a term used in numerous sports. In baseball, it is the space where the first-base coach and third-base coach stands. 
It is also common practice for a coach who has a play at his base to leave the coach's box to signal the player to slide, advance or return to a base. This may be allowed by the umpire if the coach does not interfere with the play in any manner.

In basketball, it's a line that represents how far a coach may come towards centercourt. In soccer, the coach's box is simply a term for the typical area that the coach or manager is standing.

In NCAA basketball, many coaches step out on the floor, leaving the coach's box. The most famous free-roamers are Kentucky coach John Calipari, Baylor coach Scott Drew, and Michigan State coach Tom Izzo.

See also

References

Terminology used in multiple sports
Baseball terminology